The Oman Open is a European Tour golf tournament, held at Al Mouj Golf in Muscat, Oman. When founded in 2018, it was one of five European Tour events to be staged in the Arabian Peninsula, but is currently one of six.

Though it was the first European Tour event in Oman, the course had previously hosted the Challenge Tour's National Bank of Oman Golf Classic from 2013 to 2014 and the NBO Golf Classic Grand Final from 2015 to 2017.

Winners

References

External links
Coverage on the European Tour's official site

Former European Tour events
Golf in Oman
Recurring sporting events established in 2018
2018 establishments in Oman